Stefan Postma (born 6 October 1976) is a Dutch former footballer who played as a goalkeeper. He is currently a goalkeeping coach at his last club, AGOVV Apeldoorn.

Club career

Early career
Postma started his professional career at FC Utrecht before moving to De Graafschap.

Aston Villa
Postma was signed by Aston Villa on 14 May 2002 for 1.5 million pounds, upon Peter Schmeichel's transfer to Manchester City. Postma's debut came as a substitute in a 0–1 defeat against Southampton on 21 October, following the dismissal of Peter Enckelman.

After newly appointed Villa manager David O'Leary purchased Danish keeper Thomas Sørensen, Postma became the club's second choice goalkeeper at the club. He made two appearances in the 2003–04 season and three in 2004–05.

Wolves
Towards the end of his time at Villa, Postma was linked with transfers to several European clubs before going on loan to Wolverhampton Wanderers at the start of the 2005-06 season. In January 2006, he signed a contract to remain at Wolves until the end of the season. It was announced on 5 May that year that he would leave Wolves in the summer, and he returned to the Eredivisie with ADO Den Haag .

Later career
In August 2008, Postma rejoined former club De Graafschap on a six-month contract.

Personal life
In 2006, Postma became embroiled in a sex scandal when his ex-girlfriend posted a pornographic video featuring his partner penetrating him with a strapon on YouTube. The Mirror reported that Postma had "originally managed to keep the video secret by buying it when his ex tried to sell it on eBay."

References

 Stephan Postma, Yahoo! Sport UK, URL accessed January 10, 2006.
 Postma extends his stay at Wolves BBC News, January 6, 2006, URL accessed January 10, 2006.
Postma will not be offered a new deal BBC Sport, May 5, 2006 URL accessed same day.

1976 births
Living people
Dutch footballers
Expatriate footballers in England
Aston Villa F.C. players
Wolverhampton Wanderers F.C. players
Premier League players
FC Utrecht players
Association football goalkeepers
ADO Den Haag players
De Graafschap players
AGOVV Apeldoorn players
Eredivisie players
Eerste Divisie players
Cypriot Second Division players
Ermis Aradippou FC players
Netherlands under-21 international footballers
Footballers from Utrecht (city)
Expatriate footballers in Cyprus
Dutch expatriate footballers
FC Utrecht non-playing staff
AGOVV Apeldoorn non-playing staff